Saad Qais, is an Iraqi former professional footballer born in 1967 who played in the Iraqi national team (1987–1993).

Saad was one of the star Iraqi players of the late 1980s and through the 1990s. He first made his name with Al-Shorta in the early 1980s, he later joined Al-Rasheed helping them win the League, cup and the Arab Club Championship in 1988 and another league title in 1989. He later revealed that he was forced to join the club by Uday Hussein, who punished the team after every loss.

He played in the Iraqi Olympic side in Seoul and the Gulf Cup in 1988.

Saad captained Al-Shorta to the Iraqi league title in 1998. In early 2001, he retired from football.

Career statistics

International goals
Scores and results list Iraq's goal tally first.

References

1967 births
Living people
Sportspeople from Baghdad
Iraqi footballers
Iraqi expatriate footballers
Iraq international footballers
Olympic footballers of Iraq
Footballers at the 1988 Summer Olympics
Al-Shorta SC players
Al-Rayyan SC players
Al-Karkh SC players
CA Batna players
Qatar Stars League players
Expatriate footballers in Qatar
Expatriate footballers in Algeria
Iraqi expatriate sportspeople in Qatar
Iraqi expatriate sportspeople in Algeria
Association football wingers